Edwin Ubiles (born November 26, 1986) is a Puerto Rican former professional basketball player. He played college basketball for Siena College. A native of Poughkeepsie, New York, he averaged 14.8 points per game over his four seasons at Siena, where he finished third on the school's all-time scoring list with 1,939 points.

Professional career
In November 2011, Ubiles joined the Dakota Wizards of the NBA Development League. He played in the 2012 D-League All-Star Game, and on March 18, 2012, he signed a 10-day contract with the Washington Wizards. He became the first player from Siena College to play in a regular season NBA game when he debuted with the Wizards on March 21, 2012. After his contract expired, he rejoined the Dakota Wizards. On April 20, 2012, Ubiles was selected as the D-League Rookie of the Year after averaging averaged 19.6 points, 5.0 rebounds and 3.1 assists. He was also named to the All-NBA D-League First Team and All-Rookie First Team.

On September 9, 2012, Ubiles signed with Cholet Basket of France. However, he was released by the club a month later due to his wish to rehabilitate his injured foot at home in the United States. On January 11, 2013, he was acquired by the Santa Cruz Warriors of the NBA Development League. He was traded to the Springfield Armor on March 5, 2013.

On September 10, 2013, Ubiles signed with Kyoto Hannaryz of Japan for the 2013–14 bj league season. In 50 games for Kyoto, he averaged 15.5 points, 3.8 rebounds, 2.2 assists and 1.0 steals per game.

On August 1, 2014, Ubiles signed a one-year deal with Maccabi Ashdod of the Israeli Basketball Premier League. In November 2014, he parted ways with Ashdod after appearing in six league games. He later moved back to Puerto Rico where he played for Atenienses de Manatí and Vaqueros de Bayamón in 2015.

In November 2015, Ubiles signed with Caciques de Humacao for the 2016 BSN season.

On December 29, 2016, Ubiles signed with the Chautauqua Hurricane of the Premier Basketball League.

In December 2017, Ubiles signed with the Albany Patroons of the North American Premier Basketball.

In June 2018, Ubiles signed with Leones de Ponce for the 2018 BSN season.

Ubiles currently plays for the Albany Patroons of The Basketball League.

Personal life

Ubiles has twin daughters, Laila and Thalia.

References

External links
 Edwin Ubiles at nbadleague.com
 Edwin Ubiles at sienasaints.com

1986 births
Living people
African-American basketball players
American expatriate basketball people in Israel
American expatriate basketball people in Japan
American expatriate basketball people in the Philippines
American men's basketball players
Basketball players from New York City
Basketball players at the 2011 Pan American Games
Caciques de Humacao players
Cholet Basket players
Dakota Wizards players
Kyoto Hannaryz players
Maccabi Ashdod B.C. players
Medalists at the 2011 Pan American Games
Pan American Games gold medalists for Puerto Rico
Pan American Games medalists in basketball
Puerto Rican expatriate basketball people in Israel
Puerto Rican men's basketball players
Santa Cruz Warriors players
Shooting guards
Siena Saints men's basketball players
Small forwards
Sportspeople from Brooklyn
Springfield Armor players
Undrafted National Basketball Association players
Washington Wizards players
21st-century African-American sportspeople
20th-century African-American people